Kanner is a surname. Notable people with the surname include:

Alexis Kanner (1942–2003), French-born English actor
Ellie Kanner, American film and television director
Heinrich Kanner (1864–1930), Austrian author
Leo Kanner (1894–1981), Austrian-American psychiatrist
Patrick Kanner (born 1957), French politician
Stephen Kanner (1955–2010), American architect